Psalm 123 is the 123th psalm of the Book of Psalms, beginning in English in the King James Version: "Unto thee lift I up mine eyes, O thou that dwellest in the heavens". The Book of Psalms is part of the third section of the Hebrew Bible, and a book of the Christian Old Testament. This short psalm is one of fifteen psalms that begin with the words "A song of ascents" (Shir Hama'alot). In Latin, it is known as "Ad te levavi oculos meos", and Baptist writer Charles Spurgeon calls it "the Psalm of the eyes".

In the slightly different numbering system used in the Greek Septuagint and the Latin Vulgate, this psalm is Psalm 122.

It forms a regular part of Jewish, Catholic, Lutheran, Anglican and other Protestant liturgies.

Text

Hebrew Bible version 
Following is the Hebrew text of Psalm 126:

King James Version 
 Unto thee lift I up mine eyes, O thou that dwellest in the heavens.
 Behold, as the eyes of servants look unto the hand of their masters, and as the eyes of a maiden unto the hand of her mistress; so our eyes wait upon the LORD our God, until that He have mercy upon us.
 Have mercy upon us, O LORD, have mercy upon us: for we are exceedingly filled with contempt.
 Our soul is exceedingly filled with the scorning of those that are at ease, and with the contempt of the proud.

Uses

Judaism 
Is recited following Mincha between Sukkot and Shabbat Hagadol.
Verse 3 is part of the final paragraph of Tachanun.

Catholic
Since the Middle Ages, this psalm was traditionally performed during the office of Sext week, namely from Tuesday until Saturday, according to the Rule of St. Benedict set in 530 AD.

In the Liturgy of Hours today, Psalm 123 is recited or sung at Vespers on the Monday of the third week of the four weekly liturgical cycle, as the psalm that follows. In the liturgy of the Mass, it is read on the third Sunday in Ordinary Time of the year.

Rhyming
Spurgeon points out that Psalm 123 is a rare case of a psalm that rhymes in Hebrew, although he notes Samuel Cox's comment that the rhymes are "purely accidental".

References

External links 

 
 
 Text of Psalm 123 according to the 1928 Psalter
 Psalms Chapter 123 text in Hebrew and English, mechon-mamre.org
 A song of ascents. To you I raise my eyes, / to you enthroned in heaven. text and footnotes, usccb.org United States Conference of Catholic Bishops
 Psalm 123:1 introduction and text, biblestudytools.com
 Psalm 123 – Looking to the LORD for Mercy in Affliction enduringword.com
 Psalm 123 / Refrain: Our eyes wait upon the Lord our God. Church of England
 Psalm 123 at biblegateway.com
 Hymns for Psalm 123 hymnary.org

123